Velia Martínez Febles (born June 14, 1920 in Tampa, Florida - May 22, 1993 in Miami, Florida) was a well-known actress, singer and former nightclub dancer.

Martínez was born in Tampa to Cuban parents. In 1941, she settled in Havana, where she became a well-known show business personality. In 1945, while in Mexico, she married the Cuban actor, producer and writer, Ramiro Gómez Kemp (1914-1981).  They had two daughters Georgina and Mayra Cristina.

She was an accomplished dancer and cabaret star, she performed in Cuba's most prestigious theaters including the Cabaret Montmartre. In 1945, she played the title role in the play Filomena Marturano in Havana's Thalia Theater, which is considered her pivotal role in her career. In 1958 she acted opposite Errol Flynn in the movie The Big Boodle.  She left Cuba in 1960 with her family and lived two years in Puerto Rico where she appeared in a TV soap opera Yo Compro Esa Mujer (I'll Buy That Woman).  In 1962, she came to Miami and continued performing on stage.  In 1965 she appeared in My Son Is Not What He Appears (Mi Hijo No Es Lo Que Parece), at the Martí Theater. In 1966, she appeared in the movie, The Devil's Sister as Carmen Alvarado.

In 1977, she reached the pinnacle of popularity as the grandmother Adela in the PBS series ¿Qué Pasa, USA?.  Her last great performance on stage was in 1989 in Luis Santeiro's play, Mixed Blessings at the Coconut Grove Playhouse and her last television role was of Elena, a hair salon owner in the Univision series Corte Tropical in 1992.

Selected filmography
 Madman and Vagabond (1946)

References

 The Miami Herald - May 25, 1993 - Velia Martínez, Grandmother on ¿Qué Pasa, USA?
 Guije article

External links
 ¿Que Pasa USA? website

American expatriates in Cuba
American film actresses
1920 births
1993 deaths
American people of Spanish descent
20th-century American actresses